Oxford East is a constituency represented in the House of Commons of the UK Parliament by Anneliese Dodds of the Labour Party, who also serves as party chair.

Created in 1983, the constituency covers the eastern and southern parts of Oxford in Oxfordshire. It borders Oxford West and Abingdon to the west and Henley to the north, east and south.

Constituency profile
The seat includes Oxford city centre and the majority of the Oxford colleges, Cowley (containing a large car factory) and adjoining parts of the city including a broad area of mid-to-low rise council-built housing, Blackbird Leys, which has kept varying amounts of social housing (see Right to Buy).

A large percentage of the seat's electorate consists of students from Oxford and Oxford Brookes universities (the latter being in the seat). Areas in the seat with a high proportion of private housing include Headington, which is mainly a mixture of student tenants and relatively high-income families, and the similarly prosperous areas of Grandpont and New Hinksey in the south of the city.  At the end of 2010 unemployment claimant count was 2.3%, 45th of the 84 South East constituencies and close to the mean of 2.45%.

History
From 1885 until 1983 the vast bulk of the area of the seat, as it has variously been drawn since 1983, was in the abolished Oxford constituency, historically Liberal then for some decades Conservative, and which then alternated with the Labour Party, who took that seat in the late 1960s and late 1970s.

For the first four years (from 1983) Oxford East was served by Conservative Steven Norris. He was defeated by Labour candidate Andrew Smith who held the seat for the next 30 years before retiring. The Conservative share of the vote fell to a low to date, of 16.7%, in 2005, a year when the seat became an emphatic Labour–Liberal Democrat contest, and the votes for Andrew Smith were 963 more than the "Lib Dem" candidate: a majority of 2.3% of the votes (electorate voting).

Smith held the seat in 2015; it was the 80th-safest of Labour's 232 seats won that year by percentage of majority. On his retirement the local Labour party selected Anneliese Dodds. At the 2017 general election she took 23,284 votes (43.2%), broadly in line with many of Smith's results.

In 2015 and 2017 the runner-up became a Conservative as before the last two general elections. The Green Party's candidate has stood in all eight contests since the party was branded as such, once retaining its deposit, in 2015, with almost 12% of the vote.

Ousted ex-MP Norris won the largest runner-up's share of the vote to date (40.4%) during the 1987 general election, which was in general a drubbing for the Liberal party who had a candidates' pact with Social Democratic Party (SDP) candidates and a fallout among the SDP's Gang of Four. Turnout has ranged between 78.9% in 1987 and 55.8% in 2001.

Boundaries and boundary changes

1983–1997
 The City of Oxford wards of Blackbird Leys, East, Headington, Iffley, Marston, Quarry, St Clement's, Temple Cowley, and Wood Farm, and the District of South Oxfordshire wards of Littlemore, Marston, and Risinghurst.
The constituency formed largely from the majority of the abolished Borough Constituency of Oxford.  Also included three wards in the District of South Oxfordshire, previously part of Henley (Littlemore) and the abolished constituency of Mid-Oxon (Marston and Risinghurst).

1997–2010
 The City of Oxford wards of Blackbird Leys, East, Headington, Iffley, Littlemore, Marston, Old Marston and Risinghurst, Quarry, St Clement's, South, Temple Cowley, and Wood Farm. 
The 1997 boundary changes reflected changes to local government boundaries with the majority of the area comprising the three South Oxfordshire wards having been absorbed into the City of Oxford. The remaining, semi-rural Conservative-leaning areas were transferred back to Henley. The urban Oxford South ward that was strong for the Liberal Democrats and Labour was transferred from Oxford West and Abingdon.

Since 2010
 The City of Oxford wards of Barton and Sandhills, Blackbird Leys, Carfax, Churchill, Cowley, Cowley Marsh, Headington, Headington Hill and Northway, Hinksey Park, Holywell, Iffley Fields, Littlemore, Lye Valley, Marston, Northfield Brook, Quarry and Risinghurst, Rose Hill and Iffley, St Clement's, and St Mary's.

Parliament accepted the Boundary Commission's Fifth Periodic Review of Westminster constituencies which slightly altered this constituency, in order to equalise electorates, for the General Election 2010 following changes to the City's ward structure. These changes added Carfax and Holywell wards from Oxford West and Abingdon. This meant that Oxford city centre and the majority of Oxford colleges fell into Oxford East which had mainly been in Oxford West and Abingdon. It was predicted that these changes would benefit the Liberal Democrats, whose share of the vote had fallen slightly in 2005. When the seat was contested on the new boundaries, Labour incumbent, Smith, quadrupled his majority on a broad range of pro-Labour two-party swings which was replicated in few seats in that election.

Members of Parliament

Elections

Elections in the 2010s

Elections in the 2000s

Elections in the 1990s

Elections in the 1980s

Neighbouring constituencies

See also
List of parliamentary constituencies in Oxfordshire
 Boundary Commission for England
 Fifth Periodic Review of Westminster constituencies
 First-past-the-post voting
 History of local government in England
 Rural districts
 Urban districts
 Homogeneity

Notes

References

Sources
Election result 2015
Election result, 2015 (BBC)
Election result, 2010 (BBC)
Election result, 2005 (BBC)
Election results, 1997–2001 (BBC)
Election results, 1997–2001 (Election Demon)
Election results, 1983–1992 (Election Demon)

Oxford East
Constituencies of the Parliament of the United Kingdom established in 1983
Parliamentary constituencies in Oxfordshire
Politics of Oxford